Paratettix toltecus, known generally as the toltec pygmy grasshopper or toltecan grouse locust, is a species of pygmy grasshopper in the family Tetrigidae. It is found in Central America, North America, and South America.

References

Tetrigidae
Articles created by Qbugbot
Insects described in 1861